Calabozo, officially Villa de Todos los Santos de Calabozo, is a city in Venezuela located in the Guárico state, capital of the Francisco de Miranda Municipality and former capital of the state. It has a population of 168,605, according to the National Institute of Statistics (INE) in 2020. It is located in the center-west of Guárico state, and is one of the main rice producers in the country. In addition, it has the largest irrigation system in Venezuela.

Calabozo, is a mostly colonial city and is linked to its modern urban areas, being the largest colonial center in the country, and is located at 105 m a.s.l. n. m., at the margin of the Guárico River in the high central plain. Its location is on the banks of the Generoso Campilongo Dam, an important work both in its time and today, being the largest in Venezuela and one of the largest in Latin America.

It is the seat of the Roman Catholic archdiocese of Calabozo.

Geography
Calabozo is situated in the midst of an extensive llano on the left bank of the Guárico River, on low ground, 325 feet above sea-level and 123 miles S.S.W. of Caracas. The plain lies slightly above the level of intersecting rivers and is frequently flooded in the rainy season; in summer the heat is most oppressive, the average daily temperature being around 31 degrees Celsius.

In its vicinity are thermal springs. The principal occupation of its inhabitants is cattle-raising. The town is well built, regularly laid out with streets crossing at right angles, and possesses several fine old churches, a college and public school. It is a place of considerable commercial importance because of its situation in the midst of a rich cattle-raising country.

Climate 

The climate is typical of the geographical area, typical of the plains, with an average annual temperature of 27.5 °C; a monthly maximum of 34.4 °C and a minimum of 20 °C. There are two well-differentiated climatic periods: the dry period between the months of November to May and the rainy period between the months of May to October. The months where the temperature is higher and the suffocating heat are: March and April and the month of September.

History

It is believed to have been an Indian town originally, and was made a town as one of the trading stations of the Compañía Guipuzcoana de Caracas in 1730. However, like most Venezuelan towns, Calabozo made little growth during the 19th century. In 1820 the Spanish forces under Francisco Tomás Morales were defeated here by the revolutionists under Simón Bolívar and José Antonio Páez.

Economy

The waters of Calabozo have accumulated large numbers of Caribbean fish, this book changed the economic face of Calabozo happened to become the pilot site of a complex agricultural economy.

Agriculture 

The irrigation system has encouraged the cultivation of rice, maize, pulses, snuff, tomatoes, paprika, cotton and cassava among others such as hunting and herding.

Livestock 

Cattle farming predominates and has encouraged the planting of grass in large areas as feed. Beyond its use as meat, livestock is mostly used for milk. In fact, Calabozo is one of the nation's main producers of cheese, widely considered Venezuela's best.

Sites of interest 

Guarico Reservoir: it serves as an irrigation system for an extensive rice-growing area, where it is known as the Guárico River Irrigation System. This system is also used to control floods caused by extreme rainfall in the low plains or in the southern zone. Inaugurated in 1957 by president Marcos Pérez Jiménez, it is the largest made in Venezuela.

Aguaro-Guariquito National Park: is a protected area  with the status of national park.

Transportation 

It has a National Airport, Calabozo Airport which currently does not have commercial flights.

Notable people
 
Filiberto Rodríguez Motamayor (1867–1915), writer, lawyer and poet
Antonio Estévez (1916-1988), musician, composer and conductor.

References

 

 
Cities in Guárico
1724 establishments in the Spanish Empire